Vincente Joaquim Zico (27 January 1927 – 4 May 2015) was a Catholic archbishop.

Born in Luz, Minas Gerais, Zico was ordained to the priesthood in 1950. He was appointed coadjutor archbishop of the Roman Catholic Archdiocese of Belem do Pará, Brazil, in 1980, and succeeded to the archdiocese in 1990. He retired in 2004.

Notes

1927 births
2015 deaths
21st-century Roman Catholic archbishops in Brazil
People from Minas Gerais
Place of death missing
20th-century Roman Catholic archbishops in Brazil
Roman Catholic bishops of Belém do Pará
Roman Catholic archbishops of Belém do Pará